Senator Wescott may refer to:

Dayne Wescott (1850–1929), Wisconsin State Senate
Samuel Wescott (fl. 1850s–1860s), New Jersey State Senate
Walter S. Wescott (1828–1908), Wisconsin State Senate